Warmer Communications is the sixth studio album released by Average White Band. The title is a play on Warner Communications, parent company of AWB's Atlantic Records label at the time of the album's release.

The album was rereleased in 1994 on the Atlantic & Atco, Rhino Entertainment Remasters Series as "Warmer Communications... and More," containing as Bonus Tracks, AWB's 2 Live Performances from The Atlantic Family Live at Montreux (Atlantic #2-3000 June 1, 1978).

Track listing
"Your Love Is a Miracle" (White, Gorrie) – 6:04
"Same Feeling, Different Song" (Stuart, White, Gorrie, Ball) – 5:16
"Daddy's All Gone" (James Taylor) – 4:38
"Big City Lights" (Ferrone, Gorrie, Stuart) – 4:52
"She's a Dream" (Stuart) – 5:36
"Warmer Communications" (Gorrie, Ferrone, Ball, Stuart) – 4:07
"The Price of the Dream" (Gorrie, White) – 3:59
"Sweet & Sour" (Gorrie Stuart, Ball) – 4:50
"One Look Over My Shoulder (Is This Really Goodbye?)" (Ball, Gorrie, Stuart) – 3:55

2002 Japan Reissue as "Warmer Communications... and More"
1-9 Original album tracks (as above)
 "McEwan's Export" (Live) (Alan Gorrie)
"Pick Up the Pieces" (Live) (Roger Ball, Hamish Stuart, AWB)

Personnel
Average White Band
Alan Gorrie – Bass, Guitar, Lead and Backing Vocals
Hamish Stuart – Bass, Guitar, Lead and Backing Vocals
Roger Ball – Keyboards, Alto Saxophone, String Arrangements, Horn Arrangements
Malcolm Duncan – Tenor Saxophone, Soprano Saxophone
Onnie McIntyre – Guitar, Vocals
Steve Ferrone – Drums, Percussion
with:
Cornell Dupree - guitar on "Daddy's All Gone"
Michael Brecker - flute on "She's a Dream", additional tenor saxophone and flute
Randy Brecker - additional trumpet
Ray Barretto - additional percussion and congas
Lew Delgatto - additional baritone saxophone and flute
Marvin Stamm - additional trumpet
Barry Rogers, Tom Malone - additional trombone
Rubens Bassini - additional percussion

Charts

Singles

References

External links
 Average White Band-Warmer Communications at Discogs

1978 albums
Average White Band albums
Albums produced by Arif Mardin
Atlantic Records albums